Pstereo (initiated 2007 in Trondheim, Norway) is a music festival arranged at Marinen, Trondheim, every year in August.

Background 
The festival is named after Pstereo an album by DumDum Boys, and mainly focuses on music in the genres elektronika, pop and rock. Next to the music the focus is on environmental awareness. Pstereo had 17,500 visitors in 2009. In 2014 the number of spectators had grown to approximately 25,000.

Bands and artists (in selection)

References

External links 

Festivals in Trondheim
Music festivals in Norway
Cultural festivals in Norway
2007 establishments in Norway
Culture in Trondheim
Music in Trondheim
Music festivals established in 2007
Rock festivals in Norway
Indie rock festivals
Summer events in Norway